The Basilica Argentaria is a portico with pillars lining the Temple of Venus Genetrix in the Forum of Caesar in Rome (Italy). The name only appears in late sources of the age of Constantine.

History
The building was erected under Trajan, with the purpose of adapting the slopes of the Capitoline Hill after the removal of the gap between it and the Quirinal Hill.

Design
It was higher than the level of the square and the access was through two staircases on the south-west end of the portico. The portico had two rows of pillars made of tuff stones and its naves were covered with barrel vaults, partially preserved. As the basilica rose in an obligated space, it has an irregular drawing, turning round the temple and probably continuing out of the present archaeological area, close to the south-west exedra of the Trajan's Forum.

Remains
The plaster covering the back wall of the building, still preserved, displays several graffiti, some of which quote lines of the Aeneid: this detail makes possible that the basilica housed a school, mentioned by late sources about the Trajan's Forum and the Forum of Augustus.

Further reading
 Filippo Coarelli, Guida archeologica di Roma, Verona, Arnoldo Mondadori Editore, 1984.

Buildings and structures completed in the 2nd century
Argentaria
Ruins in Italy
Trajan